Southern Prairie Railway is a tourist railway operated by the Ogema Heritage Railway Association (OHRA) in Ogema, Saskatchewan.

History
Southern Prairie Railway offers train tours that travel from Ogema to Pangman, Saskatchewan and Horizon, Saskatchewan. The tours operate on weekends from May to October. Chartered trips are also available.

The centerpiece of their operation is a fully restored 1912 CP Rail train station.  The station was moved to Ogema from Simpson, Saskatchewan in 2002, as the original station was removed in 1960s. The feature engine is a 1945 GE "44 tonner" diesel locomotive purchased in 2010 from Conway Scenic Railroad in North Conway, New Hampshire. Also purchased in 2010, the 1925 Pullman low-roof passenger car arrived from Gettysburg, Pennsylvania, and received a top-to-bottom restoration. Staff and volunteers are also working to restore a 1952 CP Rail baggage car and a 1977 CP Rail wide-vision caboose to join the fleet.

Equipment

Locomotives

Rolling stock
 1925 Pullman low-roof passenger car
 1952 CP Rail baggage car
 1977 CP Rail wide-vision caboose

References

External links
Southern Prairie Railway
All Aboard - The Western Producer
All aboard the Ogema Heritage Train tour
Tourist train plans steam ahead in Ogema, Sask
Oooh, Aaah, Ogema (Saskatchewan, That Is)

Heritage railways in Canada
Rail transport in Saskatchewan
Heritage railways in Saskatchewan